Mobile Revelers were an American soccer team that played in Mobile, Alabama.

Year-by-year

Defunct soccer clubs in Alabama
USISL teams
1995 establishments in Alabama
1997 disestablishments in Alabama
Soccer clubs in Alabama
Association football clubs established in 1995
Association football clubs disestablished in 1997